Francis Fraser may refer to:

Francis Charles Fraser (1903–1978), cetologist
Frankie Fraser (1923–2014), English criminal
Francis Humphris Fraser (1833–1911), New Zealand politician
Francis Richard Fraser (1885–1964), Scottish physician

See also
Frank Fraser (disambiguation)
Francis Frazer, fictional character
Frances Frazier, 1988 Miss Georgia
Frank Frazier (1960–2000), American football player
Fraser (surname)